Ee Maaya Peremito is a 2018 Telugu-language romance film, produced by Divya Vijay on V.S.Creative Works and directed by Ramu Koppula. Starring newcomers Rahul Vijay and Kavya Thapar with music composed by Mani Sharma.

Plot 
Chandu is a jobless vagabond and Sheetal is the daughter of a rich businessman. She falls in love with Chandu's good nature but her father, Pramod, objects to the relationship, demanding Chandu to prove he is worthy of his daughter.

Cast

Rahul Vijay as Sri Ramachandra Murthy / Chandu
Kavya Thapar as Sheetal Jain
Rajendra Prasad as Babu Rao
Murali Sharma as Pramod Jain
Posani Krishna Murali
Satyam Rajesh
Thagubothu Ramesh
Chitram Seenu
Josh Ravi
Bhadram
Rallapalli
Ananth
Kadambari Kiran
Jogi Raju
Duvvasi Mohan
Easwari Rao
Pavitra Lokesh
Anju Asrani

Soundtrack 

The music composed by Mani Sharma. Lyrics were written by Sri Mani. The music was released by Mango Music Company. The audio launch was held on 28 July at Hyderabad.

Controversy 
The Jain community raised objections over the use of a sacred Jain religious hymn in the movie's Arihanthanam song.

References

External links 

2018 films
2010s Telugu-language films
Films scored by Mani Sharma